Archive is a 2020 British science fiction film written and directed by Gavin Rothery, in his directorial debut. It stars Theo James, Stacy Martin, Rhona Mitra, Peter Ferdinando, Timea Maday Kinga and Toby Jones. Set in 2038, the film follows a scientist who is trying to advance artificial intelligence a step further than human beings, all while bringing his wife back from the dead.

The film was originally set to premiere at South by Southwest in March 2020 but was cancelled due to the COVID-19 pandemic. It instead received a digital release with limited screenings in theatres around the United States on 10 July 2020.

Plot

In the city of Chicago, Jules Almore is killed in a car crash leaving her husband devastated. By the year 2038 in Japan, George Almore (Theo James) is working on a true human-equivalent AI, and his latest prototype is almost ready. This sensitive phase is also the riskiest as he has a goal that must be hidden at all costs—being reunited with his dead wife Jules, who had died in a car accident years ago. His wife's consciousness is stored in a device that, according to the sales pitch, will allow up to 200 hours of interaction with the deceased. His work also includes updates to a previously-abandoned facility that appears to require numerous and significant upgrades to its inadequate security system. His work is aided by his second prototype, J2 (Timea Maday Kinga).

Almore is visited by a small team from Archive who perform an inspection of the device. They note that the security seal is broken and threaten legal action; however, Almore points out that they are on his company's property and hints at the legal repercussions of a confrontation, and the Archive team backs off and leaves.

J2 is shown to be quite sophisticated, but, as Almore reveals, has only developed the brain of a 16-year-old, and is incapable of developing any further. J2 is aware of Almore's work on a third prototype and appears to have become jealous, which leads to J2's increasingly unpredictable behavior.
Meanwhile, the J3 android is ready and begins to move and interact with completely human mannerisms, responses and emotions. Almore gets a call from his boss, who implies that he may be in trouble for his actions during the Archive team's visit. He assures her that she has nothing to worry about.

J2, confronted with the realization that she will never be anything more or better than she already is, destroys herself by walking into a lake. This prompts another call from the boss, indicating that a team is on the way to shut down Almore's research. He makes the final call to his wife on the Archive machine, and ends the call saying "see you soon." J3 overhears this and realizes her purpose, and that her own consciousness will be overwritten by that of Almore's wife, who will live on in her body. Though initially angry and afraid, she accepts her fate, and the memory download is completed as the team storms the compound.

At this point, any sign of the exterior team suddenly evaporates, and all is calm. The Archive starts ringing with an incoming call from Jules. J3 implores him not to answer, but Almore does and speaks to Jules, also hearing a child's voice on the line which is revealed to be that of his daughter. Almore was the one who died in the accident, while Jules survived and is now raising their daughter in the real world, and the ordeal he went through was a simulation within his own Archive, which has finally expired.
With his Archive expired, it has been prepared for burial at his official funeral. Jules and their daughter say their final goodbyes and leave.

Cast
Theo James as George Almore
Stacy Martin as Jules Almore/J3, George's wife
Martin also provides the voice for the robot J2
Rhona Mitra as Simone, VP of Internal Development at Artisan Robotics
Peter Ferdinando as Mr. Tagg
Richard Glover as Melvin, an associate of Vincent Sinclair
Hans Peterson as Elson
Lia Williams as the voice system of George's house
Toby Jones as Vincent Sinclair, an executive of the Archive company

Production
On 14 May 2017, it was announced that concept and graphic artist Gavin Rothery, who had worked with Duncan Jones on his first feature, Moon, would write and direct Archive with Theo James set to star. On 31 October 2018, Philip Herd and Cora Helfrey of Independent joined as producers for the project, with Stacy Martin starring opposite Theo James. James also brought on his production label, Untapped, and would be producing alongside Andrew D. Corkin. Vertical Entertainment later acquired the distribution rights for the U.S, with the international rights currently up for sale.

Principal photography began in Hungary in late October 2018 and ended in February 2019. Laurie Rose served as director of photography. The digital make up and advance clean up was done by the UK-based company Koala FX.

Release
The film was released on 10 July 2020 on digital streaming platforms by Vertical Entertainment after it was pulled from South by Southwest in March 2020 which was cancelled due to the COVID-19 pandemic. Limited screenings were also available in various theatres around the U.S.

The film was released on 13 August 2020 in Russia in 260 screens and was number 5 at the box office charts in its opening weekend.

Critical response
The site's critical consensus reads: "Archive executes its fairly basic program efficiently, offering sci-fi fans an engaging meditation on love and human nature."

On Metacritic, the film has a weighted average of score of 67 out of 100, based on six critics, indicating "generally favorable reviews".

Accolades

References

External links
 
 

British science fiction films
Cyberpunk films
British robot films
Vertical Entertainment films
Films scored by Steven Price
Films not released in theaters due to the COVID-19 pandemic
2020 directorial debut films
2020 films
2020 science fiction films
2020s English-language films
2020s British films
Films about consciousness transfer
Films set in 2038